Tancred is the stage name of former Now, Now guitarist Jess Abbott.

As Tancred, Abbott has released four full-length albums to date. Her first album, titled Capes, was released in 2011 on No Sleep Records. In 2013, Abbott signed to Topshelf Records and released her self-titled second full-length album. In 2016, Abbott signed to Polyvinyl Records and released her third full-length album titled Out of the Garden. On March 27, 2018, she premiered her new single Reviews and announced an album, Nightstand, that was released on June 1, 2018 via Polyvinyl.

Out of the Garden was recorded by OFF!’s Steven McDonald and That Dog.’s Anna Waronker, and was praised by many outlets, including NPR Music, which declared: "Out of the Garden is just phenomenal... this to me feels like a breakthrough."

A video for Tancred's song "Pens" was handpicked for NPR Music's "Songs We Love" series and featured a cameo by Sadie Dupuis of Speedy Ortiz.

Tancred has toured with Foxing (band), Julien Baker, Weaves, and Jessica Hernandez & The Deltas, and also performed at the 2016 Riot Fest.

Discography

Studio albums 
 Capes (2011, No Sleep)
 Tancred (2013, Topshelf)
 Out of the Garden (2016, Polyvinyl)
 Nightstand (2018, Polyvinyl)

EPs 
 String & Twine (2011, Cardinal White Records)

Singles 
 Birthday Candles (2017, Bandcamp)

References

External links
 Tancred

Musical groups established in 2011
Polyvinyl Record Co. artists
Topshelf Records artists
No Sleep Records artists
2011 establishments in the United States